Złotniki may refer to:

Złotniki, Lower Silesian Voivodeship (south-west Poland)
Złotniki, Kuyavian-Pomeranian Voivodeship (north-central Poland)
Złotniki, Podlaskie Voivodeship (north-east Poland)
Złotniki, Kutno County in Łódź Voivodeship (central Poland)
Złotniki, Pajęczno County in Łódź Voivodeship (central Poland)
Złotniki, Poddębice County in Łódź Voivodeship (central Poland)
Złotniki, Lesser Poland Voivodeship (south Poland)
Złotniki, Świętokrzyskie Voivodeship (south-central Poland)
Złotniki, Subcarpathian Voivodeship (south-east Poland)
Złotniki, Kalisz County in Greater Poland Voivodeship (west-central Poland)
Złotniki, Poznań County in Greater Poland Voivodeship (west-central Poland)
Złotniki, Opole Voivodeship (south-west Poland)

See also
Złotnik